Zoltán Böröczky (born 16 May 1979) is a Hungarian former professional tennis player.

Born in Budapest, Böröczky was a member of the Hungary Davis Cup team for their 1999 campaign, featuring in ties against Bulgaria and Denmark. He registered a doubles win (with Attila Sávolt) over Bulgaria's doubles pairing and was beaten in his only singles rubber, by Denmark's Thomas Larsen.

ITF Futures finals

Doubles: 3 (1–2)

See also
List of Hungary Davis Cup team representatives

References

External links
 
 
 

1979 births
Living people
Hungarian male tennis players
Tennis players from Budapest